Jean Bodman Fletcher (January 20, 1915 – September 13, 1965) was an American architect who was a founding member of the well-respected design firm known as TAC, the Architects' Collaborative in Cambridge, Massachusetts.

Early life and education
Fletcher was born Jean Bodman in Boston, the daughter of Fenimore L. Bodman and Maud Rogers Bodman. She graduated from Smith College in 1937, and finished her architectural training at the Cambridge School in 1941, an architecture school for women affiliated with Harvard University and Smith.

Work 
With her husband, Norman Collings Fletcher she entered and won many residential architecture competitions. In 1945, the Fletchers joined forces with their mentor, Walter Gropius, and five other young architects, including Sarah and John C. Harkness, to establish TAC. The prize money from their winning entries in the Smith College Dormitory Competition provided the first office funds.

Death
Jean Bodman Fletcher died of breast cancer on September 13, 1965, at age 50.

References

Further sources
Pioneering Women of American Architecture, Jean Bodman Fletcher
 Gropius, Walter, ed. The Architects Collaborative, 1945-1965. Teufen, AR, Niggli: 1966, p. 12.
 New Yorkers Win Mention: Homes in Modern Styles Featured in Architects' Awards, New York Times, May 13, 1945, p. R1.
 "Prize Plans in National Contest Stress 'Livability' of New Homes." New York Times, May 13, 1945, p. R1.

1915 births
1965 deaths
20th-century American architects
Smith College alumni
Harvard University alumni
American women architects
Deaths from breast cancer
20th-century American women artists
People from Boston